Military of the Kingdom of Poland can refer to:
 Military of the Kingdom of Poland, used during warfare in Medieval Poland during the Piast and Jagiellon dynasties (10th–16th centuries)
 Military of the Polish-Lithuanian Commonwealth
 Military of the Congress Kingdom of Poland